Aleksandr Grigorenko (Oleksandr Serhiyovych Hryhorenko; born 6 February 1985) is a Kazakhstani former professional footballer from Ukraine.

Career
Grigorenko made his professional debut in the Ukrainian Second League for FC Ros Bila Tserkva in 2002. In 2004 Grigorenko decided to move to Kazakhstan, with FC Atyrau before signing for FC Shakhter Karagandy.

In December 2014, Grigorenko left FC Ordabasy.

Grigorenko was once a main goalkeeper for the Kazakhstan U-21 team and the Kazakhstan champion FC Shakhter.

Honours
 Kazakhstan Premier League bronze: 2007.

References

External links
 
 Aleksandr Grigorenko: In our team they look for marginals
 Profile at eurosport.fr
 Profile at Shakhtyor Karagandy
 

1985 births
Living people
People from Bila Tserkva
Ukrainian footballers
Ukrainian expatriate footballers
Expatriate footballers in Kazakhstan
Ukrainian emigrants to Kazakhstan
Kazakhstani footballers
FC Shakhter Karagandy players
FC Atyrau players
FC Taraz players
Kazakhstan Premier League players
Association football goalkeepers
Sportspeople from Kyiv Oblast